Jinwen University of Science and Technology (JUST) is a private university in Xindian District, New Taipei, Taiwan.

The university offers undergraduate and graduate programs in various fields, including business, engineering, design, and humanities. 

JWUST has six colleges, namely College of Business, College of Engineering, College of Design, College of Humanities, College of Tourism and Hospitality, and College of Continuing Education. Each college offers various undergraduate and graduate programs.

History
JUST was originally established as Jin-Wen College in 1980. In 1998, it was upgraded to Jin-Wen Institute of Technology. In 2007, the college's name was finally upgraded to Jinwen University of Science and Technology.

Faculties
 College of Business Management
 College of Electrical, Information and Resources Engineering
 College of Hospitality and Tourism Management
 College of Humanities and Design

Notable alumni
 Chen Bolin, actor
 Jay Shih, actor, singer and television host

See also
 List of universities in Taiwan

References

External links
  

1980 establishments in Taiwan
Educational institutions established in 1980
Universities and colleges in New Taipei
Universities and colleges in Taiwan
Technical universities and colleges in Taiwan